Peter the Great is a 1922 German silent historical film directed by Dimitri Buchowetzki and starring Emil Jannings, Bernhard Goetzke and Dagny Servaes. It depicts the life of the reformist Russian Tsar Peter the Great. It premiered in Berlin on 2 November 1922. The film's art direction was by Hans Dreier.

Buchowetzki had previously directed Jannings in Danton (1921) and Othello (1922). Jannings later played another Russian Tsar, Paul I, in The Patriot (1928).

Cast
 Emil Jannings as Zar Peter der Große
 Bernhard Goetzke as Minister Menschikoff
 Dagny Servaes as Zarin Katharina I
 Fritz Kortner as Patriarch Adrian
 Walter Janssen as Alexis, Zarewitsch
 Cordy Millowitsch as Zarin Eudoxia
 Alexandra Sorina as Aphrosinia

References

Bibliography
 Petro, Patrice. Idols of Modernity: Movie Stars of the 1920s. Rutgers University Press, 2010.

External links

1922 films
1920s biographical films
1920s historical films
German biographical films
German historical films
Films of the Weimar Republic
German silent feature films
Films directed by Dimitri Buchowetzki
Films set in Russia
Films set in the 1690s
Films set in the 18th century
Biographical films about Russian royalty
Cultural depictions of Peter the Great
National Film films
German black-and-white films
1920s German films